Závada is a village and municipality in the Topoľčany District of the Nitra Region, Slovakia. In 2011 had the village 591 inhabitants.

References

External links
 
 
http://en.e-obce.sk/obec/zavada-topolcany/zavada.html
http://www.obeczavada.ocu.sk

Villages and municipalities in Topoľčany District